Sindh Taraqi Pasand Party is a left-wing Pakistani political party. Dr. Qadir Magsi is the chairman of Sindh Taraqi Pasand Party.

The Sindh Taraqi Pasand Party (STP) has been engaged in socio- political activism in Pakistans since last two decades, by struggling against despotism, theocratic & fascist terrorism, and economic exploitation of smaller constituent units with a special focus on Sindh and Sindhi people. It is now poised to play a pivotal role in parliamentary politics of Pakistan, by contesting elections and undertaking formal activities in political and developmental spheres as an organized institution.

Ethnic violence against Muhajirs 
The party was involved in ethnic violence against Muhajirs in the late 1980s when they fought against the Muttahida Qaumi Movement led by Altaf Hussain. STP killed thousands of Muhajirs in 1988 Hyderabad, Sindh massacre.

Electoral history

References

External links 
 Sindh Taraqi Passand Party (STP)

Political parties in Pakistan